To celebrate the Union of European Football Associations (UEFA)'s 50th anniversary in 2004, each of its member associations was asked by UEFA to choose one of its own players as the single most outstanding player of the past 50 years (1954–2003).

Award winners
The 52 players were known as the Golden Players. The list of players was released in November 2003, and were recognized at UEFA's headquarters in Nyon. Players active at the time of announcement are marked by (*).

 Albania – Panajot Pano
 Andorra – Koldo*
 Armenia – Khoren Oganesian
 Austria – Herbert Prohaska
 Azerbaijan – Anatoliy Banishevskiy
 Belarus – Sergei Aleinikov
 Belgium – Paul Van Himst
 Bosnia and Herzegovina – Safet Sušić
 Bulgaria – Hristo Stoichkov
 Croatia – Davor Šuker
 Cyprus – Sotiris Kaiafas
 Czech Republic – Josef Masopust
 Denmark – Michael Laudrup
 England – Bobby Moore
 Estonia – Mart Poom*
 Faroe Islands – Abraham Løkin
 Finland – Jari Litmanen*
 France – Just Fontaine
 Macedonia – Darko Pančev
 Georgia – Murtaz Khurtsilava
 Germany – Fritz Walter
 Greece – Vasilis Hatzipanagis
 Hungary – Ferenc Puskás
 Iceland – Ásgeir Sigurvinsson
 Republic of Ireland – Johnny Giles
 Israel – Mordechai Spiegler
 Italy – Dino Zoff
 Kazakhstan – Sergey Kvochkin
 Latvia – Aleksandrs Starkovs
 Liechtenstein – Rainer Hasler
 Lithuania – Arminas Narbekovas*
 Luxembourg – Louis Pilot
 Malta – Carmel Busuttil
 Moldova – Pavel Cebanu
 Netherlands – Johan Cruyff
 Northern Ireland – George Best
 Norway – Rune Bratseth
 Poland – Włodzimierz Lubański
 Portugal – Eusébio
 Romania – Gheorghe Hagi
 Russia – Lev Yashin
 San Marino – Massimo Bonini
 Scotland – Denis Law
 Serbia and Montenegro – Dragan Džajić
 Slovakia – Ján Popluhár
 Slovenia – Branko Oblak
 Spain – Alfredo di Stéfano
 Sweden – Henrik Larsson*
 Switzerland – Stéphane Chapuisat*
 Turkey – Hakan Şükür*
 Ukraine – Oleg Blokhin
 Wales – John Charles

References

External links
 
 RSSSF.com UEFA Awards

 
UEFA trophies and awards
2003–04 in European football
2004–05 in European football